Piya-Kwonci (Piya, Pia, Wurkum) is a minor West Chadic language cluster of Nigeria consisting of Piya and Kwonci. The autonym for the people is Ambandi.

References

West Chadic languages
Languages of Nigeria